The Baron bidding system in contract bridge was developed in England in the 1940s  as a variant of Acol and incorporates several conventions including the Baron Three Clubs, the Baron Notrump Overcall, the Baron Two Notrump Response and the Baron Two Spades and Three Spades.

Baron Three Clubs
The Baron Three Clubs is an alternative to the responder using Stayman over a 2NT opening bid. The responder will have five points or more and an unbalanced hand. The responder bids 3, which asks opener to bid his four-card suits in ascending order. If clubs are the only four-card suit, the opener bids 3NT.

If there are two four-card suits (one being clubs), the opener bids the higher first and then 3NT for the clubs if no fit is found. The opener's 2NT is a limited bid and the responder has not shown the strength of his hand, therefore the responder will control how high the bidding goes, game or prospecting for a slam, and the suit to be played. The main advantage of this convention is that it becomes easier to reach minor-suit slams.

Baron Notrump Overcall
A 1NT overcall is used over an opponent's opening suit bid to show a weak hand with support for the unbid suits and shortness in the opponent's suit, a doubleton at most. Maximum strength is thirteen points and the minimum depends on vulnerability and partnership agreement.

Baron Two Notrump Response
When the opening is a bid of one of a suit, a 2NT response is given showing 16-18 points and a generally flat hand. 3NT shows 13-15 points. This is also known as the Two Notrump Forcing Response.

Baron Two Spades and Three Spades
After a 1NT opening, a 2 response asks opener whether he is minimum or maximum for his bid. Opener responds 2NT with a minimum or at the three-level in his lowest four-card suit with a maximum.  Responder may have one of two ranges: 11-12 points (looking for game in notrump) or 17-20 points (looking for slam in notrump or a minor suit). Similarly after a 2NT opening, 3 asks opener whether he is minimum or maximum, looking for a slam.

References

Bridge conventions